Darren Roos (born November 9, 1974) is a South African born business executive. He is the chief executive officer (CEO) of IFS. Before joining IFS in April 2018, Roos served as President of SAP ERP Cloud and executive board member of Software AG.

Having worked for the startup Redflag Communications, he joined Dimension Data in 2001 and Software AG in 2005 and quickly progressed in its sales leadership joining its group executive board. He joined SAP in January 2014 and went on to hold several senior positions before becoming President of SAP's global Cloud ERP. He joined IFS in April 2018 as its CEO. He also serves on the board of Sitecore and had been a non-executive director of Micro Focus from 2017 to 2019. In October 2020, Roos was awarded the CEO of the Year - 2020 in the Tech Ascension Awards.

References

British technology chief executives
South African business executives
SAP SE people
Stanford Graduate School of Business alumni
Harvard Business School alumni
University of South Africa alumni
People from Cape Town
1974 births
Living people